Alfred Taylor (8 February 1889 – 18 March 1966) was a British wrestler. He competed in the featherweight event at the 1912 Summer Olympics.

References

External links
 

1889 births
1966 deaths
Olympic wrestlers of Great Britain
Wrestlers at the 1912 Summer Olympics
British male sport wrestlers
Sportspeople from London